Momoh is a surname. Notable people with the surname include: 

Comfort Momoh (born c. 1962), British midwife, specializes in the treatment of female genital mutilation
EruMuse Momoh (born 1997), American soccer player
Hannah Momoh, First Lady of Sierra Leone 
John Momoh (born 1957), Nigerian broadcast journalist
Joseph Saidu Momoh (1937–2003), President of Sierra Leone
Tony Momoh (born 1939), Nigerian journalist and politician
Zackary Momoh, British-Nigerian actor

Given name
Momoh Conteh (born 1999), Sierra Leonean footballer 
Momoh Gulama, Sierra Leonean paramount chief